RPP Film Factory is a film distribution and production  company owned by Prashanth Palanikumar who is one of the founders of the famous production house Studio 9 Production . Founded in 2013, it started distributing films like Kalyana Samayal Saadham and Enna Satham Indha Neram, which entered the Limca Book of Records. RPP Film Factory is known for distributing film of various genres and identifying good talents and content. They have been promoting small budget films with extraordinary content.

History
RPP Film Factory was founded by Prashanth Palanikumar a Visual Communication graduate from Loyola College, Chennai. He had worked in many films in technical and creative departments before entering into production and distribution.  He was one of the founders of Studio 9 production which had distributed critically acclaimed film like Saattai, Naduvula Konjam Pakkatha Kaanom, Paradesi, and Masani. Due to misunderstandings between the directors the company was dissolved. Later he launched his own banner for producing and distributing films.

Upcoming Projects
"Kalyana Samayal Saadham" was remade in Hindi with "Ayushman Khurrana" and "Bhumi Pednekar" as "Shubh Mangal Saavdhan". Two films are under production with leading cast and crew.

Filmography

References

External links

Film distributors of India
Film production companies based in Chennai
Entertainment companies established in 2013
2013 establishments in Tamil Nadu
Indian companies established in 2013